Chilpi is a town in Kabirdham district of Chhattisgarh, India

Geography
It is located at an elevation of 807 m above MSL.

Location
National Highway 12A passes through Chilpi.  Nearest airport is Raipur Airport.

References

External links
 About Chilpi
 Satellite map of Chilpi

Cities and towns in Kabirdham